Steve Lingren (born April 15, 1973) is a Canadian retired professional ice hockey defenceman and coach who is served as an assistant coach with the Victoria Salmon Kings of the ECHL.

Career statistics

External links
 

1973 births
Canadian ice hockey defencemen
Cornwall Aces players
Dayton Bombers players
ERC Ingolstadt players
Hershey Bears players
Ice hockey people from British Columbia
Kalamazoo Wings (1974–2000) players
Kansas City Blades players
Kentucky Thoroughblades players
Living people
Milwaukee Admirals players
People from the Cowichan Valley Regional District
Rochester Americans players
Victoria Cougars (WHL) players
Victoria Salmon Kings coaches
Victoria Salmon Kings players
Canadian expatriate ice hockey players in Germany
Canadian ice hockey coaches